Hollywood Rip Ride Rockit is a steel roller coaster at Universal Studios Florida in Orlando, Florida. Announced on March 19, 2008, the coaster officially debuted on August 19, 2009, despite original plans to open several months earlier in the spring. Hollywood Rip Ride Rockit features on-ride music LED lighting, and on-ride photos and videos captured from cameras mounted in each passenger row.

History

During the second week of January 2008, Universal Parks & Resorts filed a Notice of Commencement with Orange County, Florida indicating that they were to construct a ride system that they had code-named "Project Rumble." The notice also stated that the contractor was "Maurer Rides GmbH," located in Munich, Germany.

The new attraction was officially announced by Universal Studios on March 19, 2008. It also mentioned that each train would be equipped with a multi-media package, LED lights, built-in video recorders, and the option for riders to choose a song from a list to be played during the course of the ride. The ride would also include six near miss encounters. At the time, the new roller coaster was scheduled to open in Spring 2009. Also, in the months after the announcement, Universal Studios surveyed guests on what songs they think should be included in the roller coaster. Some of the artists that guests could choose from were: The Black Eyed Peas, Bee Gees, The Beach Boys, and Johnny Cash.

Construction began in May 2008 with preliminary land clearing, which caused the removal of some of Twister...Ride it Out's outdoor extended queue. The first track pieces were installed during the week of December 7, 2008. In February 2009, Universal launched a website for the attraction, which included a construction blog and photographs chronicling progress of the attraction's construction. The track layout was completed at the end of April 2009 with the crowning of the lift hill.

In April 2009, Universal confirmed that the roller coaster would not open as originally planned and said it would open in the summer. Though Universal has never mentioned what the exact problem with the roller coaster was, it is believed by newspapers that issues with the anti-rollback devices on the lift hill that were not working correctly caused the delay.

After the issues with the ride were resolved, Hollywood Rip Ride Rockit began public previews in mid-August 2009. On August 19, 2009, Universal Studios Florida officially opened the attraction. It continued to experience technical issues early on after opening. A number of its features worked sporadically or not at all. There were also operational issues, such as slower-than-expected loading times that diminished capacity and led to long lines. One of the notable complaints was the rough ride experience, especially for guests sitting in the back seat.

Hollywood Rip Ride Rockit closed indefinitely in September 2010. Maurer issued an alert warning that stress testing of its X-Car ride vehicles had found that the coupling bars holding the trains together would not be "fatigue endurable." It eventually reopened on October 28, 2010, with refurbished trains to improve the ride experience.

Ride experience

Queue
Guests first enter into one of three queues; either the main queue, the express queue, or the single rider queue. As of 2015, riders must pass through a metal detector in order to board, and may not board with any loose items on their person or in pockets. Lockers are provided for storage of these items. In each of the queue lines, there are several large screen displays that explain how to pick a song to play during the ride and important safety instructions. In the video, characters called "Video DJ's" are used as demonstrators to provide a visual explanation.

Ride

The station for the roller coaster is a unique design, in which trains enter and slow down but do not stop. There is a moving sidewalk on both sides that moves at the same speed as the train allowing riders to board. Riders have approximately 30 seconds to take their seat, lower the lap-bar, and make their song choice. After the restraints are checked, the train immediately begins to climb the  vertical chain lift, and the song selected by the rider begins to play. The on-ride video recorder also begins recording. The train then enters a non-inverting loop nicknamed "The Double Take", followed by an upward right turn into one of the several mid-course brakes. It drops back down, going through a hole in a wall before entering a left, upward helix section of the coaster that is nicknamed "The Treble Clef". Next the train enters a quick element nicknamed "The Jump Cut", a non-inverting corkscrew. This is followed by a large dip that takes the train into a second set of mid-course brakes. Following a small drop to the left, the track straightens for a moment before making a right turn, a left turn, and then another right leading into the third set of mid-course brakes. An s-bend turn follows, which leads the train into an inclined loop and a fourth set of brakes. Finally, the train drops once more, travels over a small hill, and then enters the final brake run as the song playing ends.

Track
Because the lift hill is vertical, a special evacuation system is used in the event that a train stalls on the lift. Also, the track is filled with sand and gravel to reduce the noise when a train is on the track. Throughout the layout of the roller coaster, there are 6 sets of brakes to control the speed of the trains.

Trains
The roller coaster operates with seven stadium-style seating X-Car trains. Each train has two cars that can hold six riders each for a total of twelve riders per train. On the headrest of each seat there are two speakers that play music during the ride. The speakers have been designed so that only the rider's selected music track will be audible. On the restraint is a small touch screen where riders can choose which song they want to listen to during the ride. Additionally, the trains are equipped with multi-colored lights that can be seen during the night.

Musical selections
The initial announcement just said that there would be 5 categories of songs. The full tracklist was not released until July 6, 2009, with Universal Studios Florida unveiling thirty songs (6 in each category) that can be played during the ride.

A touchscreen is built into the restraint on each seat. Once riders board the train and lower the restraint, they may use this screen to select one of the five music categories, then one of the six songs in the chosen category. If the rider fails to make a selection within 30 seconds, a song will be chosen at random. The chosen song begins as the train climbs the vertical lift hill. Some soundtracks begin partway into the full-length song, or end early, since the total ride time is 1 minute and 39 seconds.

In 2022, Stronger by Kanye West and Harder, Better, Faster, Stronger by Daft Punk were removed from the ride's tracklist for unknown reasons.

Hidden song selections
In addition to these 28 songs, Universal Studios Florida also provided additional "hidden" songs that are available to riders, but are not included in the queue video.

In order to access these songs, the rider must press and hold the ride logo on the touch screen for 10 seconds after lowering the restraint. The list of song categories will then be replaced by a 10-digit keypad, on which the rider can enter a three-digit code for the desired song.

Incident
On August 1, 2013, an unidentified woman received minor injuries when the ride came to a sudden stop.

See also
Hollywood Dream: The Ride - a Bolliger & Mabillard roller coaster which uses similar technology for music.

References

External links

Hollywood Rip, Ride, Rockit at Universal Orlando Resort

Roller coasters in Orlando, Florida
Roller coasters in Florida
Roller coasters introduced in 2009
Universal Studios Florida
Roller coasters operated by Universal Parks & Resorts
Universal Parks & Resorts attractions by name
2009 establishments in Florida